Balamevvadu is a 2022 Indian Telugu-language romantic thriller directed by Satya Rachakonda and starring Dhruvan Katakam and Nia Tripathi.

Cast 

Dhruvan Katakam as Satyanarayana 
Nia Tripathi as Parnika
Babloo Prithviraj as Phani Bhushan 
Suhasini Maniratnam as Dr. Yashoda
Nassar as Dr. James
 Vivek Trivedi
 Jabardasth Apparao
 Idream Anjali
 Mani Mahesh 
Sravan Bharath as Thomas Jefferson

Soundtrack
The songs were composed by Mani Sharma.

Reception 
A critic from The Times of India wrote that "Overall, Balamevvadu touches a chord by highlighting the plight of commoners when they believe in the medical system. The unique way of presenting this fact makes it a decent watch". A critic from Cinema Express wrote that "Balamevvadu is a decent love story which explores love in the first half and exposes the medical mafia in the second half". A critic from Sakshi rated the film  out of five stars.

References 

2022 films
2020s Telugu-language films
Indian crime drama films